Tectin is an organic substance secreted by certain ciliates.  Tectin may form an adhesive stalk, disc or other sticky secretion. Tectin may also form a gelatinous envelope or membrane enclosing some ciliates as a protective capsule or lorica. Tectin is also called pseudochitin. Granules or rods (called protrichocysts) in the pellicle of some ciliates are also thought to be involved in tectin secretion.

See also
 Chitin
 Conchiolin
 Sporopollenin

References

Ciliate biology
Biomolecules